The Santa Catarina Municipality is one of the municipalities of the State of Nuevo León. Municipalities are often named after its municipal seat, hence the municipal seat of the Santa Catarina Municipality is the City of Santa Catarina.

The municipal government is headed by the municipal president of Santa Catarina (aka mayor of Santa Catarina).

Monterrey metropolitan area
Municipalities of Nuevo León